Arm wrestling (also spelled armwrestling) is a sport with two opponents who face each other with their bent elbows placed on a table and hands firmly gripped, who then attempt to force the opponent's hand down to the table top ("pin" them). The sport is often casually used to demonstrate the stronger person between two or more people.

In the early years other names were used to describe the same sport, including arm turning, arm twisting, twisting wrists, wrist turning and wrist wrestling.

History
Current knowledge of the history of arm wrestling is based on written and pictorial evidentiary sources, and arm wrestling may have existed in any number of ancient or medieval cultures that did not record it. Popular claims that it was practiced in ancient Egypt or ancient Greece, while not necessarily implausible, are founded on misinterpretation of sources (confusing references to wrestling with the arms or images of wrestling with the hands or of dancing for arm wrestling).

Arm wrestling (formerly known as "wrist wrestling" in this context in English, the literal translation of the Japanese) is known to have been widely practiced by the Edo period of Japan, depicted in art from as early as the 1700s, and recorded in writing as early as the eighth century in the Kojiki. Illustrations unambiguously demonstrate this was the same as modern arm wrestling. It is likely that the modern popularity of arm wrestling comes from the Japanese treatment of the sport.

Arm wrestling was also practiced by Spaniards and Cubans in the nineteenth century, possibly via the influence of Japanese contact; these arm-wrestlers would place a piece of money under each elbow.

Arm wrestling in the United States was formerly also called "Indian arm wrestling"; some sources suggest the practice originated amongst American Indian peoples such as the Lenape. A similar sport, "Indian hand wrestling", attested from the early 20th century and commonly ascribed Native American origins, was conducted standing upright. Both "Indian arm wrestling" (or simply "arm wrestling") and "Indian hand wrestling" were popular among Boy Scouts and other American youth in the early to mid 20th century.

Organized arm wrestling tournaments arose in the 1950s, while the World’s Wristwrestling Championship, Inc. (WWC) was the first armwrestling organization, organized the first World’s Wrist-wrestling Championship - held in Hermann Sons Hall, the second largest auditorium in Petaluma, California in 1962; later those (WWC's) World championships were known as Petaluma World’s Wrist-wrestling Championships.

Description

Casual
Casual arm wrestling is common between individuals simply as a game or casual contest of strength. Casual arm wrestling is usually performed seated on any available surface (commonly a standard table or chair) and lacks the technical rigor, specially designed table, and regulation of competitive arm wrestling. Injuries are more common in casual settings than in competition due to a general lack of conditioning and proper technique. Additionally, participants in casual matches are less likely to be close in strength, and such strength disparities often result in dangerous positions which increase the likelihood of injury.

Competition
In competitive arm wrestling, a match is conducted with both competitors standing up with arms placed on a tournament arm wrestling table. Competitions are usually conducted in either tournament or supermatch form. A tournament usually involves successive rounds of a single match (or "pull") between any two opponents and a large number of total participants. A "supermatch" usually involves anywhere from 3 to 6 matches between two specific athletes, with short rest periods between consecutive matches. The supermatch format is usually reserved for more experienced and high-level pullers, and is analogous to a traditional bout in other combat sports.

Competition tables
Tables used for organized armwrestling competitions include elbow pads, which indicate the area within which a competitor's elbow must remain throughout the match, pin pads, which indicate the height an opponent's hand much reach before being considered pinned, and hand pegs, which must be gripped with the non-wrestling arm and are used for additional leverage. These tables vary slightly in their dimensions based on the governing body of the competition, but are always symmetrical with predefined distances between the elbow pads and pin pads.

Competition divisions
As with other combat sports in which body weight is recognized to play a significant role in victory, arm wrestling tournaments are usually divided along weight classes as well as left and right-handed divisions. Because most humans and therefore most pullers are right-handed, right-handed competitions are both more common and more prestigious than equivalent left-handed competitions.

There are also rules governing fouls and imposition of penalties, such as when a competitor's elbow leaves a mat where the elbow is meant to remain at all times, when a false start occurs, and attempting to escape arm pinning by breaking the grip ("slipping") with the opponent which may result in a loss. Paraphrasing USAF rules, arm wrestlers must straighten their wrists with less than a one-minute time lapse during competition.

Types
armwrestling
stand-up arm wrestling
sit-down arm wrestling 
wristwrestling 
stand-up wristwrestling
sit-down wristwrestling

Technique

There are many styles and moves in arm wrestling, each with their own relative balance of hand and arm pressures. The three most common general moves are the hook, toproll and press.

Pressures
Many force vectors, or "pressures", contribute to the overall success of an armwrestler. Generally speaking, these pressures can be classified into hand pressures and arm pressures.

Hand pressures
The primary hand pressure is "cupping", or wrist flexion. The flexing of the wrist by the forearm muscles bends back the opponent's wrist, and dramatically decreases their accessible leverage during the match.

Secondary hand pressures include supination (as in a hook), pronation (as in a toproll) and "rising", or wrist abduction. Each of these can be used to get an opponent into an uncomfortable or disadvantageous position, from which the initiator can more easily pin.

Arm pressures
The three major arm pressures in armwrestling include side pressure, back pressure, and "posting" or upward pressure.

Side pressure involves contraction of the pectoral muscles and whole body movement in order to generate force against the opponent perpendicular to the plane of the palm. This pressure is most directly associated with movement of the hands toward the pin pad, and as such is often the main or only pressure instinctively utilized by novices trying to pin their opponent.

Back pressure involves contraction of the muscles of the back (primarily the lats) in order to adduct the upper arm and generate force toward the self and away from the opponent. If successful, the application of back pressure increases the elbow angle of the opponent and therefore limits their leverage.

"Posting", or upward pressure, involves contraction of the biceps in order to flex the elbow. If successful, the application of upward pressure decreases the elbow angle of the initiator, therefore increasing their leverage against their opponent.

Moves and Styles

Hook
The "hook" or "hooking" is any move classified within the "inside" style of arm wrestling. The defining characteristic of a hook is supination of the hand and forearm, which results in a match centered on pressure applied through the wrist. Generally, a successful hook is more dependent on raw arm strength (centered on the biceps) than hand control and technique compared to a toproll.

Toproll
The "top roll" or "top rolling" is any move classified within the "outside" style of arm wrestling. The defining characteristic of a toproll is pronation of the hand and forearm, in which the thumb becomes the point in which pressure is applied as you rotate into the opponent's hand. Generally, a successful toproll is highly dependent on technique and the strength of the hand and forearm, more so than a hook or press.

Press
The "triceps press", "shoulder pressing", or "shoulder rolling" is often described as the third primary move or style of arm wrestling. The defining characteristic of a press is the rotation of the competitor's torso in order to position their shoulder behind their hand. This position allows the athlete to better utilize their triceps strength and body weight, and is usually only attempted in neutral or advantageous positions in order to finish an opponent. A press can be accessed from either a hook or toproll.

Factors
Various factors can play a part in one's success in arm wrestling, technique and overall arm strength being the two greatest contributing factors. Other considerations such as the length of an arm wrestler's arm, muscle and arm mass/density, hand grip size, wrist endurance and flexibility, reaction time, and other traits can lend advantages of one arm wrestler over another.

Governing organizations
The World Armwrestling Federation (WAF) has been the universally recognized global governing body for professional arm wrestling and comprises 82 member countries.

Common rules
The rules and regulations for arm wrestling are designed to create an even playing field and to prevent broken bones. Below are some of the general arm wrestling regulations:

 The shoulder of both players must be in a square position before the match starts.
 All starts will be a "Ready… Go!" The cadence will vary.
 Competitors must start with at least one foot on the ground. After the "go" players may have both feet off the ground.
 One's opposite (non-wrestling) hand must remain on the peg at all times.(If one slips off the peg and quickly regains contact it does not count as a foul in most cases)
 If the elbow of the offensive competitor comes off the pad prior to a pin it will not be counted and a foul will be given.
 To make a winning pin, a player must take any part of the opponent's wrist or hand (including fingers) below the plane of a touch pad.
 A false start is a warning. Two warnings equals a foul.
 Competitors will forfeit the match with a second foul. (Subject to change based on foul limits)
 If opponents lose grip with one another, a strap is applied and the match is restarted.
 Intentional slip-outs are fouls, which occur when player's palm completely loses contact with the other player's palm.
 Competitors may not touch their body to their hand at any time.
 Shoulders may not cross the center of the table at any time.
 Competitors will always conduct themselves in a sportsperson-like manner while at the tournament.
 The most important arm wrestling rule: the referee's decision is final.

Training
Improvement at armwrestling is most driven by two factors: strength development/conditioning, and experience.

While there is no consensus among top athletes as to whether table training or weight training is most effective for developing armwrestling strength, it is generally accepted that both are important. Common lifts for armwrestling include bicep curls, wrist curls, and rows, all of which develop overall pulling strength and greater pressures against the opponent. In addition to standard dumbbells and barbells, serious pullers often make use of bands and cable systems with specialized handles in order to more closely replicate the angles and tensions of real armwrestling during weight training.

Table training often involves pulling many casual or semi-serious matches from various starting positions, and developing one's strategy and techniques against a large variety of opponents and styles.

Associated injury

Arm wrestling puts substantial torque/torsion stress on the upper arm's humerus bone, to a degree seen in few other physical activities. Generally speaking, the bones and connective tissue involved in arm wrestling are not prepared to accommodate the stresses imposed by the sport, and severe injuries can occur without proper training and conditioning. An arm bone may fail in  a diagonal break at or below the shoulder and elbow midpoint. This is significantly more likely when one of the pullers rotates their shoulder inward (as in a press) without first getting behind their hand, a position known as the 'break arm' position. It is for this reason that a common safety cue for beginners is to maintain eye contact with their own hand. This helps prevent rotation of the shoulders away from the arm, and therefore limits the likelihood that the puller will reach the 'break arm' position.

Common injuries include humeral shaft fractures, shoulder trauma, muscle strain, golfers' elbow, and less commonly pectoralis major/biceps rupture.

Injuries associated with armwrestling occur most commonly between novices or athletes of significant strength difference, when competitors are forced into unsafe positions out of inexperience or inability to maintain advantage. Matches or practices involving experienced pullers with the conditioning and knowledge to stay safe very rarely produce injuries.

In popular culture 
 In The Old Man and the Sea (1952), the character Santiago recalls winning an arm wrestling match that lasted for a whole day.
 In the episode "Dead Lift" of the series The Streets of San Francisco (first broadcast May 5, 1977), where Arnold Schwarzenegger plays an important role, one sees his friend Franco Colombu, himself a high-level bodybuilder, and also a competitor of athletic strength and "strong men" contests, make a showdown in a bar.
 At the beginning of the film Predator (1987), the characters played by Arnold Schwarzenegger and Carl Weathers improvise a showdown after a vigorous handshake.
 The film Vendetta dal futuro (1986) features arm wrestling.
 The film Over the Top (1987) features a wrestling champion, played by Sylvester Stallone.
 The film Addams Family Values (1993) opens with a showdown between Gomez and Thing.
 The Fly (1986 film) features an arm wrestling scene in which one competitor's arm suffers a compound fracture.
 In the episode of The Simpsons "Marge's Son Poisoning" (2005), Homer enters an armwrestling tournament.
 The 2007 Japanese rhythm video game Moero! Nekketsu Rhythm Damashii Osu! Tatakae! Ouendan 2 has an unlockable bonus image of two oendan holding an informal arm-wrestling contest at a picnic, awarded to players who are able to raise their total high score to an exceptional level.
 The documentary Pulling John (2009), focuses on the battle for pre-eminence between heavyweights John Brzenk, Travis Bagent and Alexey Voevoda.
 The reality TV show Game of Arms (2014) showed teams of American competitors sacrificing to become the nation's best armwrestler.
 In Italy, the term used for arm wrestling is braccio di ferro, and the cartoon character Popeye is also called Braccio di Ferro.

See also

 Hand strength
 Grip strength
 Handshake
 Grappling
 Thumb war

References

External links

World Armwrestling Federation
International Federation of Armwrestling (IFA)
Professional Armwrestling League (PAL)
Official page of The Ultimate Arm Wrestling League

 
Strength sports
Games of physical skill
Individual sports